Alligaticeras is an extinct genus of cephalopod belonging to the ammonite subclass.

References

Ammonite genera
Middle Jurassic ammonites
Extinct animals of India
Prehistoric animals of Madagascar
Late Jurassic ammonites
Callovian first appearances
Late Jurassic extinctions
Fossils of India